The Central Masson Range is the central segment of the three parts of the Masson Range, Antarctica. The Masson Range was discovered and named by the British Australian New Zealand Antarctic Research Expedition, 1929–31, under Douglas Mawson. This central range was mapped by Norwegian cartographers from air photos taken by the Lars Christensen Expedition, 1936–37, and named "Mekammen" (the middle comb or crest). The approved name, suggested by the Antarctic Names Committee of Australia in 1960, more clearly identifies the feature as a part of Masson Range.

References 

Mountain ranges of Mac. Robertson Land